The 1994 Southeastern Conference baseball tournament was again held as separate tournaments for the Eastern Division and the Western Division. The Eastern Division tournament was held at Cliff Hagan Stadium in Lexington, Kentucky. The Western Division tournament was held at Swayze Field in Oxford, MS. Both tournaments were held from May 18 through 21.  won the Eastern Division tournament and  won the Western Division tournament.

Regular-season results

Tournaments

Eastern Division 

 * indicates extra-inning game.

Western Division

All-Tournament Teams

See also 
 College World Series
 NCAA Division I Baseball Championship
 Southeastern Conference baseball tournament

References

External links 
 SECSports.com All-Time Baseball Tournament Results
 SECSports.com All-Tourney Team Lists

Tournament
Southeastern Conference Baseball Tournament
Southeastern Conference baseball tournament
Southeastern Conference baseball tournament
Southeastern Conference baseball tournament
College sports tournaments in Kentucky
College sports tournaments in Mississippi
Baseball competitions in Kentucky
Baseball competitions in Mississippi
Sports competitions in Lexington, Kentucky
Sports in Oxford, Mississippi